RadioWest is an hour-long radio show on history, politics, arts and culture, with a focus on the western United States and especially Utah. Hosted by Doug Fabrizio, it is produced at KUER. RadioWest often addresses topics related to Mormonism such as Proposition 8 and the excommunication of Kate Kelly for her participation in Ordain Women.

RadioWest has received awards from the Utah Headliners Chapter of the Society of Professional Journalists and the Utah Broadcaster's Association. RadioWest is well known in Utah; for example Radio From Hell's Kerry Jackson has a 'man-crush' on Doug and RadioWest. Jim Matheson was interviewed on the show.

Topics
Regular shows include 
 Sundance: Each winter during the Sundance film festival, Doug interviews creators of several films shown at the show.
 Documentary films are regularly discussed under the "Through the Lens" label.
 Music:  Shows with live music from local bands such as Fictionist are hosted several times a year under the "Local Music" label.
 Culture and Science: Books, musicals, plays, and TV shows of regional and local interest are discussed. Typically the author, producer, etc... is brought as a guest, often with others who have an academic or other special interest in the topic.

Other notable topics include: 
 Utah and the West: Newspapers in the rural west.

Episodes
Lists of episodes for 2009–2012 are given below. Since the first show on 21 May 2001, RadioWest has been heard weekdays on KUER. Approximately one fifth of the shows are rebroadcasts.

References

2000s American radio programs
2001 radio programme debuts
Radio programs on XM Satellite Radio